
Year 278 (CCLXXVIII) was a common year starting on Tuesday (link will display the full calendar) of the Julian calendar. At the time, it was known as the Year of the Consulship of Probus and Lupus (or, less frequently, year 1031 Ab urbe condita). The denomination 278 for this year has been used since the early medieval period, when the Anno Domini calendar era became the prevalent method in Europe for naming years.

Events 
 By place 

 Roman Empire 
 Emperor Probus defeats the Alamanni, advancing through the Neckar Valley. He expels the Franks from Gaul, and reorganizes the Roman defenses on the Rhine. 
 Probus resettles the Germanic tribes in the devastated provinces of the Roman Empire. He adopts the titles of Gothicus Maximus and Germanicus Maximus.
 Piracy along the coast of Lycia and Pamphylia: The Romans besiege the city of Cremna (Pisidia) and kill the Isaurian robber Lydius.

Births 
 Sima Yu, Chinese crown prince of the Jin Dynasty (d. 300)

Deaths 
 December 27 – Yang Hu (or Shuzi), Chinese general and politician (b. 221)
 Cao Yu (or Pengzu), Chinese prince of the Cao Wei state (b. 211)
 Fu Xuan (or Xiuyi), Chinese historian, poet and politician (b. 217)
 Xi Zheng (or Lingxian), Chinese essayist, poet and politician 
 Yang Huiyu, Chinese empress of the Jin Dynasty (b. 214)

References